Charles Jasper Glidden (August 29, 1857 – September 11, 1927) was an American telephone pioneer, financier and supporter of the automobile in the United States. Charles Glidden, with his wife Lucy, were the first (in 1902) to circle the world in an automobile, and repeated the feat in 1908.

Biography 
Glidden was born in Lowell, Massachusetts on August 29, 1857. He was the adopted child of Nathaniel Glidden and Laura Clark. He came from a family that had arrived in America by 1664. His professional career began at the age of 15. At 20, he was Branch Manager for the Atlantic and Pacific Telegraph Company. He recognized early the potential of the phone together and experimented together with Alexander Graham Bell with telephone connections over the telegraph lines. Glidden funded the construction of telephone lines in Manchester, New Hampshire and was the first to recognize that the female voice was more suitable for the early telephones than the male. Accordingly, he hired women as telephone operators. The telephone exchange, which he had initiated, grew to a syndicate, which, amongst others, covered the U.S. states of Ohio, Minnesota, Arkansas and Texas. The first long-distance telephone connection (from Lowell, Massachusetts to Boston) was established on his initiative.

On July 10, 1878, he married Lucy Emma Clegworth from Manchester, New Hampshire.

Charles Glidden believed that the automobile was not just a toy for the rich, but would develop into a serious means of transport. This required building confidence in the fledgling horseless carriage and a sound road system. (At this time, major travel was usually undertaken by train or by river steamer.) In 1901 he sold his company to Bell and pursued these new goals as a private man. That same year, he and his wife made a successful trip to the Arctic Circle.

In 1902 he undertook a world tour in a British Napier accompanied by his wife and Charles Thomas, a motor engineer from Rottingdean in Sussex, England. This more than unusual journey took him over 46,528 miles through 39 countries and ultimately around the world twice. He travelled countries which never before had seen an automobile. Prerequisite for this undertaking was meticulous preparation. He even travelled with special wheels to enable him to ride on railroad tracks. Always impeccably dressed, he was very much aware of the publicity from which he took advantage of the automotive sector. So he corresponded with countless local and international newspapers. In this way he traveled to virtually all continents until 1908.

The Glidden Tour 

In 1904 he took part in the first reliability race organized by the American Automobile Association (AAA), from New York to St. Louis. Because he thought this should be a repeating event, he donated a silver trophy and a (for that time) very large prize of 2000 U.S. dollars, which he repeated annually. The AAA Glidden organized this "Glidden Reliability Tour" regularly from 1905 to 1913. The aim was to go a certain distance within a certain time and omitting no checkpoint. The winner was decided by a points system.

The first Glidden Tour was still perceived as too easy, the participants voted a winner. This was not, by the way, Charles Glidden with his Napier, but Percy Pierce in his impressive Pierce-Arrow. In subsequent races, the course grew ever longer and more demanding.

The Glidden Tour was never a trip. They always included several new routes over one hundred miles of practically trackless areas in the U.S. and occasionally in Canada. Many cars were unable to withstand this brutal treatment, and there were also incidents, such as horses shying. But it was a matter of honor that all the teams should stay together, and Glidden said that he had paid tolls to some local authorities, and refund for farmers' poultry, from his own pockets.

The victory in a Glidden Tour became a matter of prestige, as more and more manufacturers participated and motivated to succeed by the marketing benefits.

In 1946, the Glidden Tour was recreated by the Veteran Motor Car Club of America (currently under the auspices of the Antique Automobile Club of America) and has been carried out every year since then, but in a more tourist-like frame and using veteran vehicles instead. It is regarded as the oldest and most prestigious event of its kind in the United States. And still the winner is handed the silver trophy that Charles Glidden donated in 1905.

Later life 
His own travels continued. From 1905 to 1910 he was the first president of the Aero Club of America. From 1908 he began also to promote aviation. He praised the lighter than air technology (balloon flight) and was of the opinion that private planes would be similarly ubiquitous as motorcycles.

Charles Jasper Glidden died of cancer at his home in Boston on September 11, 1927.

References 

 Biography of Charles Jasper Glidden on the homepage of the Veteran Motor Car Club of America (VMCCA) (English)
 Touring with the Glidden by Barbara Reed at the Center for Lowell History at the University of Massachusetts Lowell Libraries (with picture)

1857 births
1927 deaths